Cubal is a town and  municipality in Benguela Province in Angola. The municipality had a population of 305,632 in 2014.

Transport 

It has a station on the central line of Angolan Railways.

See also 
 Railway stations in Angola

References 

 Perfil do Município do CUBAL, Província de Benguela 2009 Administraçao Municipal do Cubal, Ediçoes de Angola Lda (EAL), Octubre 2009.

External links 
 Plano Directório Municipal 2012

External links 

Populated places in Benguela Province
Municipalities of Angola